Grete Juel Jalk (1920–2006) was a Danish furniture designer. From the 1960s, she did much to enhance Denmark's reputation for modern furniture design with her clear, comfortable lines. She also edited the Danish magazine Mobilia and compiled a four-volume work on Danish furniture.

Early life

Jalk was born in Copenhagen. After graduating from high school in modern languages and philosophy, she studied at the Design School for Women (1940–43) under cabinetmaker Karen Margrethe Conradsen. She completed her studies at the Danish Design School in 1946, while receiving additional instruction from Kaare Klint at the Royal Academy's Furniture School. While consolidating contacts with numerous furniture designers, she took part in the annual competitions of the Design Museum and the Design School's furniture department where she also taught from 1950 to 1960.

Furniture design

In 1953, Jalk opened her own design studio. Inspired by Alvar Aalto's laminated bent-plywood furniture and Charles Eames' moulded plywood designs, she began to develop her own boldly curved models. General interest in her unconventional models grew only slowly although they were sought after for exhibitions and collections. In 1963, the English newspaper Daily Mail launched a competition for a chair for a man and a chair for a woman. Despite the fact that Jalk won first prize with two different laminated armchairs, the He Chair and the She Chair, they never really came into production. Her associate, cabinetmaker and furniture manufacturer Poul Jeppesen, had made some prototypes but they were burnt in a fire, bringing the project to an end. In 2008, however, Lange Production began industrial production of the She Chair. This was not Jalk's last collaboration with Jeppesen, she built upon her work in laminated plywood furniture with the creation of the side chair of 1962.

Side by side with these rather advanced experiments, Jalk developed many simple sets of furniture for manufacturers, including a high desk and stool, a set of shelves in Oregon pine and a series of chairs with upholstered seats and backs on a curved steel base. Her industrially produced furniture has clear, comfortable lines. The pieces are especially well suited for quick, straightforward production schedules. Economic in their use of materials, they soon became competitive, increasing Denmark's international reputation for furniture design. Firms in the United States and Finland have manufactured some of her lines. The designs she developed for modern homes included a wall-mounted storage system (1961), a living-room set with a coffee table (1962), a "Watch and Listen" unit (1963) with compartments for a home entertainment system to house a stereo system, TV, records, tapes and speakers. A 1960s rosewood three-piece suite made EUR 6,500 and Renato Zevi's chrome rocking chair went for EUR 1,100, double its upper estimate. Best known for her furniture design, including laminated plywood furniture for manufacturer Jeppesen, such as the side chair of 1962, and tubular steel furniture for manufacturer Fritz Henses, such as the easy chair of 1964. In 1963, Jalk designed a moulded teak chair that used two pieces of plywood bent into almost impossible forms. The chair was manufactured for Poul Jeppesen, a company that would help Scandinavia become renowned for fine modern furniture.

Jalk also designed wallpaper and upholstery, for example for Unika Væv, and silverware for Georg Jensen.

Exhibition design

Jalk also applied her creative talents to designing exhibitions, one of the best examples being the travelling show she arranged for the Ministry of Foreign Affairs in 1974 which was taken to 25 destinations around the world. The project consisted of a series of cube-shaped, corrigated-cardboard packaging boxes with silkscreen texts and logos. When unpacked, the boxes could be used as stands and wall displays. Supplemented with support rods, they could quickly serve as showcases and light fixtures. Another notable event was her Designs by Danish Women exhibition in Copenhagen's Bella Center in connection with the UN Conference on Women in 1980.

Literature

Jalk contributed enthusiastically to literature on Danish furniture. Together with Gunnar Bratvold she edited the furniture and interior design magazine Mobilia from 1956 to 1962 and again after Fratvold's death from 1968 to 1974. This led to a four-volume work, considered to be one of the most comprehensive in the field:

References

Danish furniture designers
Danish women designers
1920 births
2006 deaths
Designers from Copenhagen
Danish modern
Royal Danish Academy of Fine Arts alumni